This list of medical schools in the United States includes current and developing academic institutions which award the Doctor of Medicine (MD) or the Doctor of Osteopathic Medicine (DO) degrees, either of which is required for comprehensive practice as a physician in the United States. MD-granting medical schools are accredited by the Liaison Committee on Medical Education while DO-granting medical schools are accredited by the American Osteopathic Association Commission on Osteopathic College Accreditation. There are currently 158 accredited MD-granting institutions, and 37 accredited DO-granting institutions in the United States.

Although Delaware, Alaska, Montana, and Wyoming are the only states that lack independent medical schools, Alaska, Montana, and Wyoming are served by the University of Washington School of Medicine through the WWAMI Regional Medical Education Program. Maine and Idaho are served exclusively by one DO-granting school apiece. New York has the most medical schools at 17.

Schools and colleges of medicine

Osteopathic schools and colleges of medicine 
These schools grant the Doctor of Osteopathic Medicine (DO) degree.

Developing medical schools 
The following medical schools are under "applicant" or "candidate" status with either COCA or LCME.

See also 
 List of defunct medical schools in the United States
 Medical education in the United States
 Medical school in the United States
 The Flexner Report

Notes

References

External links 
 Untitled Document List of Accredited Osteopathic Medical Schools in the United States from the American Association of Colleges of Osteopathic Medicine
 Liaison Committee on Medical Education accredited medical schools
 World Directory of Medical Schools

 
 
Medical schools
United States
Medical schools